Molinnis is a hamlet in Cornwall, England. It is half a mile north of Bugle.

References

Hamlets in Cornwall